The 1993 Summer Universiade, also known as XVII Summer Universiade or World University Games Buffalo '93, took place in Buffalo, New York, United States.

Sports

Venues
Athletics – University at Buffalo Stadium
Baseball – Pilot Field, Sal Maglie Stadium and Dwyer Stadium
Closing Ceremonies – University at Buffalo Stadium
Diving – Alumni Arena
Football – Lewiston-Porter Central School District
Gymnastics – Niagara Falls Convention and Civic Center
Opening Ceremonies – Rich Stadium
Rowing – Royal Canadian Henley Rowing Course
Swimming – Burt Flickinger Center
Tennis – Ellicott Complex Tennis Center
Volleyball – Alumni Arena
Water Polo – Town of Tonawanda Aquatic and Fitness Center

Medal table

References

External links
 Universiade 1993 Buffalo Results
 Venues Reference

 
1993
Summer Universiade
Summer Universiade
U
Sports competitions in Buffalo, New York
Multi-sport events in the United States
20th century in Buffalo, New York
Summer Universiade
International sports competitions in New York (state)
Summer Universiade